Simon Martin may refer to:
 Simon Martin (artist) (born 1965), British artist
 Simon Martin (Mayanist), British historian, epigrapher and Mayanist scholar
 Simon Martin (bowls) (born 1976), Northern Irish lawn bowler
 Simon Martin-Brisac, (born 1992), French field hockey player